The Stemme S12 is a German high-wing, two-seat motor glider produced by Stemme of Strausberg. It was introduced at AERO Friedrichshafen in April 2015, shortly after its first flight.

Design and development
Based in the Stemme S10, the Stemme S12 features a cantilever wing, a T-tail, a two-seats-in-side-by-side configuration enclosed cockpit under a bubble canopy and a single engine with a retractable propeller.

The aircraft is made from composite material. Its  span wing employs winglets. The mid-fuselage-mounted engine is the  Rotax 914 F2/S1 four-stroke turbocharged powerplant driving a retractable, folding, variable-pitch propeller. Its maximum glide ratio is 53:1.

Specifications (S12)

See also
 List of gliders

References

External links

2010s German sailplanes
Single-engined tractor aircraft
High-wing aircraft
Motor gliders
Glider aircraft
T-tail aircraft
Mid-engined aircraft
Aircraft first flown in 2015